Tertiary Highway804, commonly referred to as Highway804, is a provincially maintained access road in the Canadian province of Ontario, located in Kenora District. The  route provides access to the Lower Manitou Falls Generating Station from Highway 105 near Ear Falls. Highway804 was designated in 1962 and has remained unchanged since then.

Route description 
The short highway travels entirely through an uninhabited forested region dotted with lakes and swamps. Near the western end of the route, a logging road branches northwest that provides a rough and winding connection to Highway 658 as well as to the northern terminus of Highway105 in Red Lake.
On an average day, only 60vehicles travel along the highway.
Highway804 is located within Kenora District, in territory that has not been organised into geographic townships.

History 
Highway 804 was designated on April 25, 1962.
It was paved in 1969. At that time, it was the only tertiary highway in Ontario that was paved, but it has since reverted to a loose gravel surface highway. The route and length of the highway have remained unchanged since it was designated.

Major intersections

References 

804
Roads in Kenora District